William the Elder may refer to:

 William Corden the Elder (1795–1867), English portrait painter and miniaturist
 William Goode, the elder (1762–1816), English evangelical Anglican clergyman
 William Holl the Elder (1771–1838), English engraver
 William Macready the elder (1755–1829), Irish actor-manager
 William Morgan (of Tredegar, elder) (1700–1731), Welsh Whig politician
 William Pitt the Elder (1708–1778), British statesman
 William Theed the elder (1764–1817), English sculptor and painter

Lists of people by epithet